Bedburg-Hau is a municipality in the district of Kleve in the state of North Rhine-Westphalia, Germany. It is located approximately 5 km south-east of Kleve.

One of its main attractions is Museum Schloss Moyland, a castle with a museum of modern art dedicated to the German artist Joseph Beuys. The park around the castle has a sculpture garden, herbal gardens and a rose garden. Castle Moyland was first documented in 1307. In the 1740s Frederick of Prussia used the castle to meet with a lover of his. In 1766 it came into possession of the von Steengracht family, and it remained in their possession until 1990 when the foundation Stiftung Museum Schloss Moyland was formed to care for it.

Once a medieval moated castle, the Castle was converted to its current appearance in the 19th century by Cologne Cathedral architect Ernst Friedrich Zwirner, who transformed it in the Gothic Revival style. After being heavily damaged in World War II, it was only after the foundation was established that a comprehensive restoration was initiated, allowing the castle to serve its current purpose. The museum was opened in 1995. The reconstruction of Moyland Schloss was finally completed in 2007 with a topping ceremony when a replica of the historical spire was placed on top of the northtower.

Bedburg-Hau is also home to St. Markus Church, which was built in 1124, and the mausoleum where Prince John Maurice von Nassau-Siegen was initially buried before his bodily remnants were brought to Siegen.

A large area near the railway station is dedicated territory of the mental hospital LVR-Klinik Bedburg-Hau. The terrain was established around 1910, and now has many architectural monuments.

Villages within the municipality of Bedburg-Hau are Hau, Hasselt, Huisberden, Louisendorf, Schneppenbaum, Till-Moyland and Qualburg.

Gallery

References

Kleve (district)